Tehranpars or Tehran Pars is an absorbed city inside the Greater Tehran Area, located in the north east area of the city. It is considered a neighbourhood of Tehran City and lies in Tehran's eastern flank inside the area of the 4th and 8th municipalities of Tehran. In 1977, squatted areas in Tehranpars were evicted on the order of the state.

Gallery

References 

Neighbourhoods in Tehran
Squatting in Iran